Thir may refer to:

 Thir (band), a US band
 Thír, wife of Þræll, the ancestress of serfs in the Eddic poem Rígsþula
 Thir Pasha, commonly known as Tahir Pasha (Egypt), a commander of Albanian bashi-bazouks and acting Ottoman Governor of Egypt in 1803